Robert Sumwalt may refer to:
 Robert L. Sumwalt (academic) (1895–1977), American engineer and academic
 Robert L. Sumwalt (entrepreneur) (1927–2016), businessman, developer, and son of the academic
 Robert L. Sumwalt (U.S. government official) (born c. 1950s), pilot, chairman of the National Transportation Safety Board, and son of the entrepreneur